Xerocrassa mesostena is a species of air-breathing land snail, a pulmonate gastropod mollusk in the family Geomitridae.

Distribution

This species is endemic to Greece, where it occurs across almost the whole island of Crete, except from the eastern and north-western tip, and the region between Chania and the Psiloritis mountains.

See also
List of non-marine molluscs of Greece

References

 Westerlund, C. A. &. Blanc, H. (1879). Aperçu sur la faune malacologique de la Grèce inclus l'Epire et la Thessalie. Coquilles extramarines. 161 pp. + errata (1 pp.), pl. 1-4
 Bank, R. A.; Neubert, E. (2017). Checklist of the land and freshwater Gastropoda of Europe. Last update: July 16, 2017

External links

 Maltzan, H. von. (1883). Diagnosen neuer kretischer Helices. Nachrichtsblatt der deutschen malakozoologischen Gesellschaft. 15: 102-106. Frankfurt am Main.

mesostena
Molluscs of Europe
Endemic fauna of Crete
Gastropods described in 1879